MV Golden Gate (previously MV Chinook) is a passenger-only fast ferry operated by Golden Gate Ferries.

The vessel is the second passenger ferry to hold the name and was purchased from Washington State Ferries by the Golden Gate Bridge, Highway and Transportation District (along with ) and entered service with Golden Gate Transit in May 2011 after a complete refit that began in late 2009.

In 1999 the vessel was built to offer 30 minute ferry service from Bremerton to Seattle, a few years later service ended because of beach possible erosion along Puget sound's Rich Passage.
As the Chinook, the ferry had previously been mothballed at the WSF Shipyard at Eagle Harbor, Bainbridge Island for four years when she was placed on eBay for auction on February 20, 2008, with an asking price of $4.5 million (USD).

References

Washington State Ferries vessels
Ferries of California
High-speed craft
1998 ships